Liam Evans (born 1 May 1997) is a Bermudian professional footballer who plays for the Bermudian national team.

Evans played in the Little League World Series Caribbean qualifiers in his youth. For secondary school he attended the prestigious Saltus Grammar School, where he played football, basketball, volleyball, badminton, track and field, softball, table tennis, tennis, cricket, and cross country. His senior year he was given Denton Hurdle Award for Bermuda's top high school athlete while also playing in the Bermudian Premier Division with Robin Hood. He then accepted a scholarship and played four years at Northern Kentucky University.

International career
His first international appearance was with the Bermuda U17s in 2013. In 2017, he debuted with a national under-20 team, in a 1–1 draw against Trinidad and Tobago. In 2018, he made his senior debut to the team with the 0–0 draw to Barbados national football team. On 12 October 2018, he scored his first international goal against non-FIFA member Sint Maarten in a 12–0 victory during the qualifying matches of the CONCACAF Nations League. He described it as "a crazy feeling" in front of the home crowd.

International goals
Scores and results list Bermuda's goal tally first.

Honours

Club
Robin Hood
 Bermudian First Division: 2013–14

Personal life
His father is Bermudian and his mother is from New York.

References

External links
 Northern Kentucky Norse bio

1997 births
Living people
Bermudian footballers
Bermuda international footballers
Bermuda under-20 international footballers
Bermuda youth international footballers
Association football defenders
Robin Hood F.C. players
Northern Kentucky Norse men's soccer players
Bermudian people of American descent